Shuntian Times, also known as Shuntian Daily,  or Shuntian Shibao,  was a Chinese-language newspaper under Japanese ownership,  published in the Shuntian Prefecture (Beiping) area of China, founded in December 1901 by Japanese entrepreneur Nakajima Masao (中島真雄). It is the first daily newspaper published by foreigners in Beiping.

Shuntian Times was a daily newspaper established by Nakajima Masao in Beiping in December 1901, when the Empress Dowager Cixi fled to Xi'an after the Boxer Rebellion. The newspaper was originally titled Yanjing Times (燕京时报), but was named "Shuntian Times" when Kuga Katsunan came to Beiping. In 1905, Shuntian Times became Japan's official propaganda organ. It was anti-Soviet and anti-Communism, calling the Soviet Union a red-blooded aggressor.

The newspaper had reporters in major cities in China, collecting intelligence on the Chinese political situation everywhere, and vigorously supporting China's pro-Japanese warlords, so it was ridiculed by people as Nitian Times (逆天时报).

On March 26, 1930, Shuntian Times published to No. 9284, and it was suspended due to the resistance of the Chinese people.

There was an American sinologist argued that, in addition to its pro-Japanese leanings, the Shuntian Times was a reliable and progressive journal. Generally speaking, it had a positive impact on Chinese political and cultural affairs.

References

Qing dynasty
Republic of China (1912–1949)
Publications established in 1901
Publications disestablished in 1930